The official results of the Women's Pole Vault event at the 2001 World Championships in Edmonton, Alberta, Canada, held on Monday August 6, 2001. There were a total number of 27 competitors.

Medalists

Schedule
All times are Mountain Standard Time (UTC-7)

Abbreviations
All results shown are in metres

Records

Qualification

Final

See also
 1998 Women's European Championships Pole Vault (Budapest)
 2000 Women's Olympic Pole Vault (Sydney)
 2002 Women's European Championships Pole Vault (Munich)
 2004 Women's Olympic Pole Vault (Athens)

References
 Results
 IAAF Results

P
Pole vault at the World Athletics Championships
2001 in women's athletics